Shanghai Municipal Investment (Group) Corporation also known as Shanghai Chengtou or SMI is a Chinese sovereign wealth fund of the Shanghai Municipal People's Government. It is one of the major shareholders of Greenland Holdings (for 20.55% shares), as well as another listed company Shanghai SMI Holding. The group owned a minority interest (33.43% stake) in Shentong Metro Group.

The group is the investor of Shanghai Yangtze River Bridge, under a subsidiary for 60% stake directly and 40% indirectly (via ).

SMI Holding was a constituent of SSE 180 Index and its sub-index SSE MidCap Index.

Subsidiaries

 Shanghai SMI Holding (46.46%)
  (100%)
 Shanghai Yangtze River Tunnel and Bridge Construction and Development (100%)
  (100%)
 Shanghai SMI Water Group (100%)
 Shanghai SMI Assets Group (100%)
  (100%)
 Shanghai SMI Environmental Industry (100%)
  (51%)
 Shanghai Laogang Waste Utilization (100%)
  (100%)
  (100%)
  (100%)
 SMI USA, a U.S. subsidiary

Equity interests

 Bright Food (22.06%)
 Greenland Holdings (20.55%)
 Shentong Metro Group (33.43%)
 Shanghai Shentong Metro Co., Ltd. (1.75% via SMI Holding, excluding shares owned by Shentong Metro Group)
 Western Securities (15.09% via SMI Holding)

See also
 Shanghai Construction Group
 Shanghai Jiushi Group
 Central Park Tower

References

External links
 

Chinese companies established in 1992
Companies based in Shanghai
Companies owned by the provincial government of China
Sovereign wealth funds
Transport in Shanghai
Real estate companies of China